Hoddle may refer to:

People 
 Carl Hoddle (1967–2008), English football player and coach
 Glenn Hoddle (born 1957), English football player and manager, played many times for England
 Robert Hoddle (1794–1881), Australian surveyor

Places
All the following geographical entities in Australia are named for Robert Hoddle.
 Division of Hoddle, former federal electoral division in the Melbourne suburbs
 Hoddle Bridge, Melbourne
 Hoddle Grid, streets in central Melbourne
 Hoddle Highway, urban highway in Melbourne
 Hoddle railway station, former station in South Gippsland

See also 
Hoddle Street massacre, shooting in Melbourne, 1987
Hoddles Creek (tributary), creek near Melbourne, Australia
Hoddles Creek, Victoria, town near Melbourne
Hoddles Track, New South Wales, Australia